Protorosaurus (from  , 'earlier' and  , 'lizard') is an extinct genus of reptile. Members of the genus lived during the late Permian period in what is now Germany and Great Britain. Once believed to have been an ancestor to lizards, Protorosaurus is now known to be one of the oldest and most primitive members of Archosauromorpha, the group that would eventually lead to archosaurs such as crocodilians and dinosaurs.

Description 

Discovery 
Over a century later, in publications in 1830 and 1832 Hermann von Meyer recognised Protorosaurus as distinct extinct reptile and gave it a formal species description, dedicating an extensive monograph to it in 1856. In 1871 Thomas Henry Huxley erected the clade Protorosauria, with Protorosaurus as the only member. The German specimens were found in the Kupferschiefer a widespread unit of Late Permian (likely Wuchiapingian) age.

In 1914, a new ceratopsian dinosaur found by Lawrence Lambe was again given the name Protorosaurus (in this sense meaning "before Torosaurus"). When Lambe found that the name had already been used for the early archosauromorph, he renamed his ceratopsian Chasmosaurus.

In 1870, a new species, Protorosaurus huxleyi was described from a railway cutting near Middridge in County Durham in northern England, in sediments belonging to the Marl Slate, a unit that is equivalent to the Kupferschiefer, however it was later shown that this specimen was not Protorosaurus, and it was subsequently placed in the new genus Adelosaurus. In 1993, a specimen of Protorosaurus was described from Quarrington Quarry also in County Durham, in sediments of the Marl Slate. This skeleton included fragments of the skull that had not previously been known. A thorough redescription of Protorosaurus was published in 2009, including a specimen with a complete skull.

Paleobiology 

Stomach contents of a specimen of Protorosaurus show the presence of numerous ovules of the locally common voltzialean conifer Ullmannia frumentaria, which was unexpected given its unspecialised dentiton of conical and unserrated teeth, which were assumed to represent a predatory lifestyle. Along with the coniferous ovules, several rounded pebbles were found in the body cavity, these may have functioned as gastroliths.

Relationships 
Protorosaurus has been suggested to be closely related to Czatkowiella from the Early Triassic of Poland, but the remains of Czatkowiella are fragmentary and mixed in with those of other reptiles, so it is possible that the taxon is a chimaera. In a comprehensive analysis of "Protorosauria" in 2021, Protorosaurus was consistently recovered as the earliest diverging member of Archosauromorpha.

The cladogram below follows an analysis by Ezcurra (2016), and highlights the position of Protorosaurus among other early archosauromorph reptiles.

Paleoenvironment 

The Kupferschiefer and equivalent Marl Slate is a marine unit that forms part of the Zechstein, a sequence of rocks formed on the edge of the Zechstein Sea, a large inland shallow sea that existed in Northern Europe during the Late Permian. The environment at the time of deposition is considered to have been semi-arid. The terrestrial flora of the Zechstein is dominated by conifers, with seed ferns also being common, while taeniopterids, ginkgophytes and sphenophytes are rare. Other terrestrial vertebrates found in the Kupfershiefer and lower Zechstein include the gliding weigeltisaurid reptiles Weigeltisaurus and Glaurung, the pareiasaur Parasaurus, the cynodont Procynosuchus, and indeterminate captorhinids, dicynodonts, and dissorophid temnospondyls.

References 

Prehistoric reptile genera
Lopingian life
Prehistoric archosauromorphs
Permian reptiles of Europe
Permian Germany
Fossils of Germany
Kupferschiefer
Fossil taxa described in 1830
Taxa named by Christian Erich Hermann von Meyer